"Le Téléphone Pleure" was a 1974 hit single by French artist Claude François. It was released on Disques Flèche/Phonogram. The song was re-recorded in English as "Tears on the Telephone" and was a hit in the British charts in 1976.

Italian singer-songwriter Domenico Modugno recorded an Italian version of the song, "Piange... il telefono", in 1975. This version was so successful that a film was made based on its lyrics, Piange... il telefono. It was directed by Lucio De Caro and starred Domenico Modugno, Francesca Guadagno, Marie Yvonne Danaud, Claudio Lippi and János Koós.

Argentine singer King Clave recorded a Spanish version of the song titled "Mi corazón lloró" ("My heart cried"), which topped the Mexican charts in 1975 and was also a hit throughout Latin America. The cast of the musical Belles belles belles also covered Claude François' song.

The song is built on a melodramatic story, in which a man calls his five-year-old daughter on the phone, but without her realizing that the heartbroken caller is actually her father - as he is the estranged husband of the child's mother, who left him before their daughter was born, six years earlier. At the end of the story, the man, faced with the final rejection of his wife (which the child has told him), says: "Je serais demain au fond d'un train" (litteraly : "I'll be at the bottom of a train tomorrow"), which means that the man is going to move out permanently.

Track list
 7-inch single (October 1974 France)

With Jean-Claude Petit and his orchestra
 7-inch single (1974 Canada)

With Jean-Claude Petit and his orchestra

Foreign versions
 7-inch single (1975 Spain)

 7-inch single (1975 UK)

 7-inch single (1975 Italy)

 7-inch single (1975 Brazil)

See also
 List of best-selling singles in France

References

French songs
1974 songs
Songs with music by Claude François
Songs about telephone calls
Songs written by Jean-Pierre Bourtayre